Ian Stewart may refer to:

Military

Ian Stewart (RAF officer), current United Kingdom National Military Representative, Supreme Headquarters Allied Powers Europe
Ian MacAlister Stewart (1895–1987), brigadier general during the Second World War
Ian Michael Stewart, former senior commander in the Royal Air Force

Politics
Ian Stewart (Labour politician) (born 1950), Scottish politician
Ian Stewart, Baron Stewartby (1935–2018), British Conservative Party politician and former MP for Hitchin, England

Sports

Ian Stewart (athlete) (born 1949), Scottish Olympic athlete
Ian Stewart (Australian rules footballer) (born 1943), member of the Australian Football Hall of Fame
Ian Stewart (baseball) (born 1985), major league baseball player
Ian Stewart (Northern Ireland footballer) (born 1961), member of the 1986 Northern Ireland Football World Cup team
Ian Stewart (racing driver) (1929–2017), Scottish Formula One driver
Ian Stewart (Scottish footballer) (born 1945/46), Scottish football player and manager

Others

Ian Stewart (mathematician) (born 1945),  English academic and science fiction author
Ian Stewart (musician) (1938–1985), British musician and early member of the Rolling Stones
Ian Duncan Stewart (1938–2017), or Ian Brady, British serial killer and author
Ian Stewart (police commissioner), former Commissioner of the Queensland Police Service (2012–2019)
Ian Stewart, founder of Gremlin Interactive and Zoo Digital
Ian Charles Stewart (born 1958), entrepreneur and co-founder of Wired magazine
Ian Stewart (priest) (born 1943), Dean of Brechin

See also
Iain Stewart (disambiguation)
Ian Stuart (disambiguation)